The men's 100 metres event at the 1983 Pan American Games was held in Caracas, Venezuela on 23 and 24 August.

Medalists

Juan Núñez of the Dominican Republic had originally won the silver, however, at the competition he tested positive for a banned stimulant fencamfamine and was stripped of his medal.

Results

Heats
Wind:Heat 1: -2.6 m/s, Heat 2: -2.4 m/s, Heat 3: -2.5 m/s

Semifinals

Wind:Heat 1: -1.5 m/s, Heat 2: -1.4 m/s

Final
Wind: +2.0 m/s

References

Athletics at the 1983 Pan American Games
1983